Nils Bertil Ahlin (17 March 1927 – 6 August 2008) was a Swedish bantamweight boxer who won a silver medal at the 1947 European Amateur Boxing Championships. He competed at the 1948 Summer Olympics, but was eliminated in the first round of the tournament, losing to Salvador Rivera of Peru.

1948 Olympic results
Below is the record of Bertil Ahlin, a Swedish bantamweight boxer who competed at the 1948 London Olympics:

 Round of 32: lost to Salvador Rivera (Peru) by decision

References

1927 births
2008 deaths
Boxers at the 1948 Summer Olympics
Olympic boxers of Sweden
Swedish male boxers
Bantamweight boxers
20th-century Swedish people